Archibald Michael Graham (born 9 August 1960) is a British journalist and broadcast commentator that specialises in being a shock jock, who presents The Independent Republic of Mike Graham on TalkTV. He was formerly the editor of the Scottish Daily Mirror and Programme Director and mid-morning presenter of The Independent Republic of Mike Graham on Talk 107, the Edinburgh sister station of Talksport.

Early life and education
Graham was born in Hampstead, London to Scottish couple Archibald Graham (1923–2008), a newspaper graphic artist, and his wife Mairi McAleavey (born 1924). 

Both Graham and his older sister attended local schools in the London Borough of Camden. Graham attended the University of Bath but dropped out.

Career
Before his radio career, Graham was a Fleet Street journalist for the best part of 25 years. He was editor of the Scottish Daily Mirror and assistant editor of the Daily Express. He covered the Bosnian War in 1992 as a reporter for the Daily Express. Graham was based in New York City from 1984 to 1992. 

Graham joined UTV's former Scottish radio station Talk 107 in February 2006, anchoring the mid-morning slot 10 a.m. to 1 p.m. with "The Independent Republic of Mike Graham". In November 2006, he was also appointed the station's programme director. In 2008, his contract was not renewed at Talk 107 and he started broadcasting on UTV's national talkSPORT radio station in the 1 a.m. to 6 a.m. slot on Saturday, Sunday and Monday. In April 2010, he presented the 10 p.m. to 1 a.m. slot every Friday and Saturday night, replacing George Galloway, as well as continuing to present the Monday 1 a.m. to 6 a.m. slot. In July 2010, he moved from weekends to weekdays, presenting alongside Mike Parry as "Parry and Graham" from 10 a.m. to 1 p.m.

Graham's future with Talksport seemed uncertain after co-host Mike Parry resigned from talkSPORT as a result of a contractual dispute, in March 2011 he took over talkSPORT's midweek 1 a.m. to 6 a.m., "Extra Time". In October 2013 Parry returned to broadcast alongside Graham, debating "a host of issues" as a segment of "Extra Time" known as "The Two Mikes", which evolved into a regular three-hour slot headlined as "The Two Mikes" from 1 a.m. to 4 a.m. In 2015, Graham and Parry launched their Two Mikes 'World Tour' at venues throughout Britain. In 2015, "The Two Mikes" were named as "Alternative Men of the Year" by The Daily Telegraph. Their most recent slot was on Friday nights at 10 p.m. on talkSPORT. Their last Radio show on Talksport was 10 p.m. to 1 a.m. on 29 March 2019. In April 2019, The Two Mikes disbanded; the first sign of the pair breaking up was the ending of their TMTV online shows. Mike Graham announced on Twitter "he was done" and therefore the team have split. Since then he has presented a solo show daily on talkRADIO between 10 a.m. and 1 p.m., playing, in contrast to his previous work, the role of a pro-Brexit commentator. From 26 April 2022, his show also appears on TalkTV, simulcasting with Talkradio.

Criticism 
In 2017, Graham was the subject of controversy after making a post on Twitter in which he called Liverpool F.C. fans "murderers", in the context of the 1985 Heysel Stadium disaster. He was also criticised in 2020 for referring to Celtic F.C as "the paedo's football club" on Twitter, while engaging in a spat with a user of the social networking platform.

In 2021, Graham was accused of disparaging a guest on his show, Cameron Ford, a climate change activist and carpenter by trade, for his use of timber as a building material. Graham suggested it was hypocritical for an environmentalist to work with timber since it requires the felling of trees. When the guest responded that timber is a sustainable building material because, unlike the concrete alternative, trees can be regrown, Graham claimed that it is equally possible to "grow concrete". Graham then abruptly terminated the interview less than a minute after it began. The blunder was ridiculed online following the interview. Later, on Jeremy Kyle's TalkRadio show, Graham doubled down on the claim, saying concrete expands as it sets. On Twitter, the radio station shared an article about self-replicating concrete.

He received further criticism later in 2022 after making a false claim that Mind, a UK mental health charity, had been funding the legal fees of individuals seeking asylum in the UK; TalkTV later issued a public apology.

References

1960 births
Living people
English male journalists
People from Hampstead
English radio personalities
English people of Scottish descent
British newspaper editors